Granarolo S.p.A. is a food company in Italy, founded in 1957 and based in Bologna. It operates in the fresh milk and dairy-cheese sector (milk, yoghurt, desserts, fresh cream and long-life cream, fresh and aged cheeses, and milk-based baby food), dry pasta, deli meats and vegetable foods.

History

Up to 21st century

1957: “The Granarolo” is launched 
In 1957, the Bologna Consortium of Milk Producers (CBPL) was founded in Milan, with the aim of producing, processing and marketing milk, and it took the name "Granarolo" as its trademark for marketing its milk.

1970s: CERPL, the first Italian unitary consortium 
In 1972, the Cooperativa Felsinea Latte joined the consortium, giving rise to the Consorzio Emiliano-Romagnolo Produttori Latte (CERPL) which was immediately joined by the Cooperativa Latte Estense of Ferrara, the Cooperativa Produttori Latte of Forlì, the Cooperativa of Ravenna and the Cooperativa of Rimini. Subsequently, the CERPL consortium acquired the Bolognaise ice cream manufacturer, Sanbon.

1980s: Granarolo grows 
During the nineteen eighties, the Cooperativa Latte Estense of Ferrara and the Cooperativa Produttori Latte of Forlì left the consortium, while at the same time, CERPL was joined by the Consorzio Granterre of Modena, and the Consortium acquired Daunia Natura of Foggia, Sogecla of Anzio, and the Cooperativa Latte Verbano of Novara (the latter went bankrupt in 1992).

1990s: the Granlatte Consortium and Granarolo S.p.A. 
Under the guidance of Luciano Sita, who was appointed president in 1991, in 1992, the Group launched the Granarolo Felsinea S.p.A. Company and acquired Dilat S.p.A. in Soliera. Acquisitions during the nineteen nineties involved the following companies: Latte San Giorgio of Locate di Triulzi (MI) in 1994, Interpack S.r.l. of Gualtieri (Reggio Emilia), Fiore S.r.l. of Udine, Sail S.p.A. of Bari (operating in Puglia under the 'Perla' brand) and Latte Cerulli of Teramo.
In 1998 the consortium that controlled the Granarolo Felsinea S.p.A. took the name Granlatte and the next year, Granarolo Felsinea changed its name to Granarolo S.p.A..

Last years

2000-2010: the acquisition campaign continues 
In 2000, Granarolo completed further acquisitions: Centrale del Latte di Milano, Vogliazzi Specialità Gastronomiche of Vercelli, Centrale del Latte di Viterbo "Alto Lazio", half the capital in Centrale del Latte di Calabria S.p.A. and Latte Bianchi in Mogliano Veneto (Treviso).

Also, in 2004 it acquired the Yomo Group to save it from bankruptcy, and with it came the Yomo, Torre in Pietra (excluding milk), Mandriot, Pettinicchio and Merlo brands, and the factories in Pasturago (Yomo), Sermoneta (Pettinicchio) and Acqui Terme (Merlo). The ex Yomo Group also included the CSL - Centro Sperimentale del Latte [Milk Experimentation Centre], tasked with producing probiotics for alimentary and pharmaceutical use (sold to the Sacco Group in 2013).
During 2006 the historical Centrale del Latte factory in Milan closed, because it was not included in the acquisition. Its production was transferred to what was previously the Yomo plant in Pasturago.

In 2008, the Group was reorganised, which lead to the closure of the subsidiary Agriok S.p.A. (which operated in the chain traceability sector), and the gastronomic branch of the company (Vogliazzi) was sold off, as was the Sermoneta cheese factory (whereas the Pettinicchio brand was retained), and the plant in Acqui Terme (selling the Merlo brand). 
In 2010 the Group set up Zeroquattro S.r.l., an integrated logistics services Company with a specific, albeit not exclusive, vocation for transporting and distributing fresh food products, via a refrigerated chain at 0 °C to 4 °C.
On the social commitment front, Granarolo was one of the promoters, along with CEFA Onlus, of the Africa Milk Project, an international self-development cooperation project, set up to create a milk sector in Njombe, one of the poorest parts of Tanzania.

2011-2014: from internationalisation to the first billion 
In 2011, Granarolo unveiled its strategic internationalisation plan, based on four main pillars: dimensional growth, and diversification of products, markets, and countries. In line with this foreign development, Granarolo Iberica S.L. was set up for distributing food products in Spain, and the Italian Lat Bri cheese factories were acquired, the third largest fresh cheeses manufacturer in Italy, as well as Ferruccio Podda, a Sardinian Company with a 60-year history, which marked the addition of aged cheeses to the Group's range. 
Granarolo International S.r.l. was set up and its first operation was in France with the acquisition of the French cheese group, CIPF Codipal (now Granarolo France S.A.S.) that produces and distributes fresh and aged cheeses under the Casa Azzurra, Les Fromagers de Ste Colombe and Les Fromagers de St Omer brands, with two productive facilities. 
Subsequent operations abroad saw the opening of Granarolo UK, a cheese exporting company in the United Kingdom and Ireland, as well as of the first commercial branch in Shanghai, China. A partnership was also formed with the Vivartia Group, which includes the largest Greek manufacturer of dairy and cheese products, Delta Foods S.A., and that distributes Greek yoghurt and cheeses in Italy. 
Meanwhile, in Italy a partnership was sealed with Amalattea S.p.A., which manufactures and markets goat's cheese and derivatives, the Pinzani cheese factory in Tuscany was acquired, which specialises in making pecorino “a latte crudo” (made from raw milk), and the Centrale del Gusto S.r.l. was inaugurated, a confectioners, ice cream parlour and coffee shop in Bologna, in collaboration with Gino Fabbri, President of the Accademia Maestri Pasticceri Italiani [Academy of Italian Master Confectioners]. 
CSR's activities gave rise to Allattami, a Bank for Donated Mothers' Milk in Bologna. This project collects mothers' milk in collaboration with the Sant'Orsola Polyclinic of Bologna. 
The 2014 financial year closed with turnover of more than a billion Euro.

2015–present: Expo and new acquisitions 
At Expo Milano 2015, Granarolo represented the Italian milk sector as a partner of the Italian Pavilion. It recorded more than 510,000 visitors from more than 30 countries, and Africa Milk Project was chosen as the best of 800 projects worldwide, for Best Practice in the "Sustainable development of small rural communities in marginal areas" category.

Various acquisition operations are part of the product diversification strategy, aimed at enhancing the Group's presence on international markets: Gennari S.p.A., a company in Parma that specialises in making Parmigiano Reggiano and Prosciutto di Parma, the long-standing Pastificio Granarolo, that makes and markets egg and semolina pasta, and CONBIO, an important Italian company that specialises in making vegetable and organic gastronomic products. 
Abroad, via the subsidiary, Granarolo International S.r.l., Granarolo Chile was set up, and Bioleche Lacteos was acquired, a long-standing Chilean cooperative of 300 dairy farmers, with a productive facility, and numerous other acquisitions were concluded: European Foods Ltd, the leading importer and distributor of Made in Italy products in New Zealand, Yema Distribuidora de Alimentos Ltda, a company that specialises in producing and marketing cheese products in Brazil, with two productive facilities, and Vinaio OÜ, renamed Granarolo Baltics OÜ, a company that operates in the cheese and dairy products marketing sector and in importing quality Italian products into Estonia. Then there was, Matric Italgross AB, a leading Swedish company that distributes Italian brands, Comarsa SA, a Made in Italy Food distribution company in Switzerland, Allfood Importação, Indùstria e Comércio SA Brazil, the leading importer and distributor of European products in Brazil, and 50% of Quality Brands International Greece, a leading Greek distributor.

In 2017, Granarolo's sixtieth anniversary, the company recorded a turnover of 1.27 billion euro, representing an increase of 7.8%. EBITDA fell by 13% to 70.1 million, while profits also decreased from 22.6 million in 2016 to 10.1 million in 2017. In terms of percentage, revenues from exports grew from 17% to 20%, revenues from Italy fell from 77% to 72% while revenues from Extra EU countries rose from 6% to 8%.

In February 2018, the company acquired Midland Food Group, with central offices in London and two distribution centres in Basingstoke and Birmingham, with production facilities in the latter. The company was founded forty years ago by Peter Shirley, records revenues of 70 million euro and employs 224 employees. Granarolo now has two hubs in Europe, one in France (the company's second market after Italy with revenues of over 150 million) and one in the United Kingdom, which is expected to become the third market of the company.

In April 2019 in Friuli, a controlling interest was acquired in Venchiaredo, a stracchino cheese production specialist with 80 employees and turnover of almost EUR 27 million. This made Granarolo one of the largest Italian producers of stracchino. In October 2021, Granarolo acquired 100% of Calabro Cheese Corp. In May 2022, Granarolo acquired majority stake in White & Seeds, a wellness startup.

In July 2022, Granarolo acquired a 60% stake in Industria Latticini G. Cuomo, a cheese production company.

On the subject of sustainability, in 2022, Standard Ethics Aei assigned a sustainability rating of 'E+' on a scale of F to EEE in the SE Food&Beverage Sustainability Italian Benchmark.

Company structure

The Granarolo Group is made up of:

Granlatte Consortium is a cooperative company, a member of Legacoop and Confcooperative, and a holding of the Granarolo Group. The cooperative includes 534 individual affiliated producers and 4 collection cooperatives, operating across 117 farms in 12 regions of Italy: Emilia-Romagna, Piedmont, Lombardy, Veneto, Marche, Puglia, Lazio, Campania, Basilicata, Friuli Venezia Giulia, Molise and Calabria (updated at 31/12/2019).

Granarolo S.p.A. (77,48% controlled by Granlatte, 19,78% by Intesa Sanpaolo and the remaining 2,74% by Cooperlat) that processes and markets the products and has 11  productive facilities. It also controls a number of companies, the main ones being:

In Italy
  Casearia Podda S.r.l. (65% by Granarolo S.p.A.): operates in Sardinia and abroad, producing pecorino, fresh milk, yoghurt, and fresh cheeses.
  Conbio S.r.l. (100% by Granarolo S.p.A.): leading Italian company for producing a vast range of vegetable and organic gastronomic products →  Unconventional S.r.l. (100% by Conbio S.r.l.)
  Gennari Italia S.r.l. (100% by Granarolo S.p.A.): a company in Parma with a long tradition of making Parmigiano Reggiano, Grana Padano and Parma Ham.
  Pastificio Granarolo S.r.l. (50% by Granarolo S.p.A.): a company that engages in producing and marketing egg and semolina pasta. 
  Centrale del Fresco S.r.l. (100% by Granarolo S.p.A.): specialized in the production of fresh milk, yoghurt, mozzarella and ricotta at FICO Eataly World in Bologna.
  Zeroquattro Logistica S.r.l. (100% by Granarolo S.p.A.): a company that heads development and commercial management of the sales channels (Normal Trade and Ho.re.ca.) and divided distribution to points of sale. 
  Valetti S.r.l. (100% by Granarolo S.p.A.): a distribution company to point of sale.
  San Lucio S.r.l. (60% by Granarolo S.p.A.): producer of cheese snacks.
  Mulino Formaggi S.r.l. (100% by Granarolo S.p.A.): a company specialized in the portioning of Parmigiano Reggiano, Grana Padano, Pecorino Romano.
  Mario Costa S.p.A. (100% by Granarolo S.p.A.): a company producer of Gorgonzola PDO
  White and Seeds S.r.l. (51% by Granarolo S.p.A.): startup company specialized in healthy snacks
  Industria Latticini G. Cuomo S.r.l. (60% by Granarolo S.p.A.): company specialized in production of Mozzarella Fiordilatte 
  Venchiaredo S.p.A. (97% by Granarolo S.p.A.), a company specialized in the production of stracchino.

In Europe
  Granarolo Benelux Sarl (100% by Granarolo S.p.A.)
  Granarolo France SAS (70% by Granarolo S.p.A.)
  Granarolo Baltics OÜ (55% by Granarolo S.p.A.)
  Granarolo Suisse SA (89% by Granarolo S.p.A.)
  Granarolo Nordic AB (100% by Granarolo S.p.A.)
  Granarolo Hellas SA (60% by Granarolo S.p.A.)
  Granarolo UK Ltd (100% by Granarolo S.p.A.) →  Midland Chilled Food UK (100% by Granarolo UK Ltd)

In the Rest of the World
  Allfood Importação Indústria e Comércio SA Brazil (100% by Granarolo S.p.A.)
  Yema Distribuidora de Alimentos Ltda. (100% by Granarolo S.p.A.)
  Granarolo Chile S.p.A. (100% by Granarolo S.p.A.)
  Granarolo New Zealand Ltd (100% by Granarolo S.p.A.)
  Granarolo USA (100% by Granarolo S.p.A.) → Calabro Cheese Corporation (100% by Granarolo USA)

Factories
The Group operates via 23 productive facilities: 14 located throughout Italy, 2 in France, 3 in Brazil, 1 in United Kingdom, 1 in Germany, 1 in USA and 1 in New Zealand.[1]

 Factories in Italy 

Bologna
 Fresh milk
 ESL Milk
 Pasteurised cream
 Fresh cheeses
 Hard cheeses

Pasturago di Vernate (MI)
 Fresh milk
 Yoghurt and desserts
 UHT milk

Usmate Velate (MB)
 Fresh cheeses
 Cheese Snacks

Soliera (MO)
 UHT milk
 Esl Milk
 Vegetable drinks

Aprilia (LT)
 Fresh cheeses

Gioia del Colle (BA)
 Fresh milk
 ESL Milk
 UHT milk

Castrovillari (CS)
	Fresh milk
	Fresh cheeses
	Hard cheeses

Sestu (CA)
	Hard cheeses
	Fresh cheeses
	Milk
	Yoghurt

Montemiccioli (PI)
	Hard cheeses
	Fresh cheeses

Granarolo dell'Emilia (BO)
	Pasta

Coriano (RN)
	Vegetable specialities

Ramuscello (PN)
	Fresh cheeses

 Factories in France 

Campagne-lès-Wardrecques (FR)

Saint-Genix-sur-Guiers (FR)

 Factory in New Zealand 

Auckland (NZ)

 Factory in United Kingdom 

Willenhall (UK)

Factory in Germany

Grünenbach (DE)

 Factories in Brazil 

Andrelândia (BR)

São Paulo (BR)

Guareí (BR)

Factory in USA

East Haven (USA)

References

External links
	International website: granarologroup.com
	Italian official website, granarolo.it
	Italian corporate website: gruppogranarolo.it
	Granlatte, granlatte.it

Food and drink companies established in 1957
Companies based in Bologna
Food and drink companies of Italy
Italian companies established in 1957
Dairy products companies of Italy